PCB may refer to:

Science and technology
 Polychlorinated biphenyl, an organic chlorine compound, now recognized as an environmental toxin and classified as a persistent organic pollutant
 Printed circuit board, a board used in electronics
 Plenum chamber burning, in some jet engines

Computing
 PCB (software), software to design printed circuit boards
 PCBoard, bulletin board software for MS-DOS
 Process control block, an operating system data structure

Organizations
 Pacific Coast Borax Company, an American mining company
 Pakistan Cricket Board, national regulatory board for cricket in Pakistan
 Partido Comunista Bolchevique, the Bolshevik Communist Party in Mexico in the 1960s
 Partido Comunista Brasileiro, the Brazilian Communist Party
 Partido Comunista de Bolivia, the Communist Party of Bolivia
 PCB Piezotronics, a manufacturer of piezoelectric sensors
 Police Complaints Board, in England and Wales

Places
 Panama City Beach, Florida, US
 Pondok Cabe Airport (IATA code), Indonesia

Other uses
 Penetration-cum-blast, ammunition type for the Arjun tank's 120mm cannon
 Pablo Carreño Busta, Spanish tennis player 
 Perfect Cherry Blossom, the seventh official game in the Japanese Touhou series by ZUN
 Public call box, a telephone booth
PCB, Bible translations into Persian 1995